An unidentified submerged object (USO) is an unidentified object submerged in water. This term does not necessarily refer to an object of paranormal activity origin.

See also
 Baltic Sea anomaly
 Bimini Road
 Cuban underwater formation
 Eltanin Antenna
 Marine archaeology in the Gulf of Cambay
 Pantelleria Vecchia Bank Megalith
 Stone structure in the Sea of Galilee
 Underwater archaeology
 Unidentified flying object (UFO)
 Yonaguni Monument

References

Ufology
Underwater archaeology
Unexplained phenomena